The 1904 Michigan Agricultural Aggies football team represented Michigan Agricultural College (MAC) in the 1904 college football season. In their second year under head coach Chester Brewer, the Aggies compiled an 8–1 record and outscored their opponents 380 to 16, including a 104 to 0 victory over Hillsdale College.

Schedule

References

Michigan Agricultural
Michigan State Spartans football seasons
Michigan Agricultural Aggies football